State Route 209 (SR-209) is a state highway in the U.S. state of Utah, following 9000 South and other east–west streets south of Salt Lake City. It connects the Bingham Canyon Mine with I-15 in Sandy and the ski areas of Little Cottonwood Canyon.

Route description

The road begins at the gate to the Bingham Canyon Mine and heads northeast as a two-lane undivided highway on the Bingham Highway. The road enters the town of Copperton and turns east. After exiting the town, the Bingham Highway splits into the Old and New Bingham Highway, with SR-209 turning northeast on the latter. The highway enters West Jordan and widens to four lanes as it curves east into 9000 South, just before crossing the Mountain View Corridor. After crossing 5600 West, the route heads downhill within the Salt Lake Valley. It crosses the Savage Bingham and Garfield Railroad line to the Bingham Canyon Mine (ex-D&RGW) at Welby, as well as Bangerter Highway and SR-68 before it reaches the Jordan River. After crossing the river, SR-209 begins climbing through the eastern part of the valley, passing through Sandy, and curving into 9400 South after crossing SR-71. The route ends at SR-210 near the mouth of Little Cottonwood Canyon, where the valley gives way to the Wasatch Range.

East of the SR-111 junction, SR-209 is included in the National Highway System.

History
State Route 177 was designated in 1965 along 9000 South between SR-68 and US-89 in Sandy, in order to provide access to the new I-15. A second route - State Route 209 - was added in 1969, following 9400 South from US-89 east to SR-210. Due to increased traffic in the Sandy area, a new alignment of SR-209 was defined east of SR-71 in 1987 to connect 9000 South directly into 9400 South, and SR-209 was extended west over this proposed roadway and SR-177 to SR-68. A 2005 change extended it farther west over a proposed roadway to meet SR-48. , the extension was built to 5600 West, though it was not yet state-maintained, and the remainder, plus a continuation to SR-111, was in the area's regional transportation plan.

In 2015, the segment of SR-48 between the Mountain View Corridor and Bangerter Highway was removed from the state highway system. SR-209 was extended west over what had previously been SR-48 to a new terminus at the Bingham Canyon Mine.

Major intersections

References

209
 209
Streets in Utah